Connor Van Vuuren is an Australian stuntman, writer, actor, and director. He co-wrote and co-directed the TV mini-series Bondi Hipsters with his brother Christiaan Van Vuuren. He has created, written, directed and starred in two seasons of ABC's Soul Mates series in 2014 and 2016 as Phoenix with his brother and Nicholas Boshier, and as a stunt actor in Mad Max: Fury Road (2015), The Hobbit: The Battle of the Five Armies (2014), and The Wolverine (2013).

Early life
Van Vuuren grew up in Cronulla. His parents met in London, his father a South African and his mother a Kiwi. He graduated with a degree in Media Arts and Production from the University of Technology Sydney and trained in acting at the National Institute of Dramatic Art (NIDA).

Filmography

Films

Television

Nominations 
Australian Directors Guild Awards
2017: Best direction in a TV or Svod comedy program (shared with Christiaan Van Vuuren)

References

External links
 
 Bondi Hipsters on YouTube
 Connor Van Vuuren on YouTube
 Van Vuuren Bros on YouTube
 Turnbull, Malcolm (15 March 2015). The Van Vuuren Brothers and New Media Models

1984 births
Living people
People from the Eastern Suburbs (Sydney)
Male actors from Sydney
Australian stunt performers
Video bloggers
Australian video bloggers
Australian YouTubers
Comedy YouTubers
Australian filmmakers
Australian directors
Australian people of Afrikaner descent
Australian people of New Zealand descent
Australian people of South African descent
Australian producers
Male bloggers